Suurlaid is a small island in the Baltic Sea belonging to the country of Estonia. Its coordinates are  

Suurlaid lies just off south coast of the Estonian island of Muhu. Together Muhu and neighbouring islands Viirelaid, Võilaid it forms Muhu Parish (Estonian: Muhu vald), the rural municipality within Saare County, Estonia. The nearest populated settlement is the village of Pädaste, which lies on the southern coast of Muhu.

The island has a total area of 1.9 km2 and is very flat. The highest elevation point on the island is only 2.1 meters above the sea level.

The area around the island is rich fish stocks and the island itself is farm managed in the spring and summer with cattle and sheep.

See also
 List of islands of Estonia

References

Estonian islands in the Baltic
Muhu Parish